Vitaliy Melnik (born 25 January 1966) is a Soviet luger who competed in the mid-1980s. He won the bronze medal in the men's doubles event at the 1985 FIL World Luge Championships in Oberhof, East Germany. He also competed in the men's doubles event at the 1988 Winter Olympics.

References

External links
Hickok sports information on World champions in luge and skeleton.

1966 births
Living people
Russian male lugers
Soviet male lugers
Olympic lugers of the Soviet Union
Lugers at the 1988 Winter Olympics
Sportspeople from Moscow